Cyclopentadienylindium(I), C5H5In, is an organoindium compound  containing indium in the +1 oxidation state. Commonly abbreviated to CpIn, it is a cyclopentadienyl complex with a half-sandwich structure.
It was the first (1957) low valent organoindium compound reported.

Preparation and chemistry
CpIn can be readily prepared by reacting indium(I) chloride with cyclopentadienyllithium:

InCl + CpLi → CpIn + LiCl

InCp reacts with BF3, BCl3, BBr3, BI3 and trimethylborane B(CH3)3 to form adducts, e.g.:

CpIn + BF3 → CpIn·BF3

In these adducts the bonding of the Cp ligand to the indium atom changes from η5 (π complexing) to η1 (σ bonding).

Salts containing the InX2− anion containing indium in the +1 oxidation state have been prepared, for example:
CpIn + HCl + N(Et4)Cl → N(Et4)InCl2+ C5H6

Structure and bonding
Solid CpIn is polymeric consisting of zigzag chains of alternating indium atoms and C5H5 units. Two indium atoms interact with the opposite faces of each C5H5− ring, nearly perpendicularly to the ring plane, and two rings interact with each indium atom, forming an angle of about 128°. In the CpIn monomer present in the vapour phase the indium atom sits on the central axis of the aromatic cyclopentadienyl anion, C5H5−.

Bonding studies have shown that the aromatic ring electrons of the cyclopentadienyl anion interact with the indium 5s and 5p atomic orbitals, and that the lone pair on the indium atom is a dominant feature.

References

Indium(I) compounds
Cyclopentadienyl complexes